Bluebird Aviation is a regional airline based in Nairobi, Kenya. It was established in 1992 and operates regional charter services. Its main base is Wilson Airport, Nairobi.

Description 
Bluebird Aviation Limited is a Kenyan air charter company based at Wilson Airport, Nairobi. The company was incorporated in 1992 and operates scheduled, non-scheduled and ad hoc air charter services within the East and Central African region with special emphasis on Eastern Africa. The company is a member of the Kenya Association of Air Operators, an umbrella body that champions the interests of aviation in Kenya.

Staff 
The company has over 80 staff ranging from airline pilots, aircraft engineers, and finance managers to ground and air operations staff.

Fleet 
The Bluebird Aviation fleet consists of the following aircraft (as of August 2019):

The Bluebird Aviation fleet previously included the following aircraft (as of July 2011):
1 Raytheon Beech 1900D Airliner
2 Beechcraft King Air 200
1 Bombardier Dash 8 Q200
3 further Fokker 50
1 Let L-410A
3 Let L-410UVP-E

Accidents and incidents 
 23 May 2004: Two Bluebird Aviation Let L-410 Turbolet planes hit each other inflight. One of the planes crashed into the ground, killing both crew members (the only people on board), while another landed safely.
 14 July 2020: A Bombardier Dash 8 Q400 (5Y-VVU) was flying from Djibouti to Beletwein, when a donkey crossed the runway as the aircraft was landing in Beledweyne Airport, causing the aircraft to veer off the runway. The plane then caught on fire after the crash. All 3 crew members onboard survived the crash.

References

External links 
 

Airlines of Kenya
1999 establishments in Kenya
Airlines established in 1999
Companies based in Nairobi
Kenyan brands